Van Meter,  Van Metre, Van Mater and Van Matre are American surnames derived from the Dutch surname Van Meteren. Most are descendants of Jan Joosten van Meteren (1626–1704) who in 1662 settled in Wiltwijck, New Netherlands, now Kingston, New York. The surname is a toponym, meaning "from Meteren" in Gelderland, the Netherlands.

People
Anna Van Meter, an American psychologist
Daniel Van Meter (1913–2000), an American eccentric
Edwin Van Meter Champion (1890–1970), an American politician from Illinois
Homer Van Meter (1905–1934), an American criminal and bank robber
Jen Van Meter, an American comic book writer
Josh VanMeter (born 1995), American baseball player 
Solomon Lee Van Meter, Jr. (1888–1937), American inventor of the backpack parachute and the ejection seat
Tom Van Meter (1943–1992), an American politician in Ohio
Vicki Van Meter (1982–2008), an American pilot

Van Matre
Joseph Van Matre (1828–1892), an American soldier
Steve Van Matre (born 1941), an American environmental activist

Settlements
Van Meter, Iowa, a town and township in Dallas County, Iowa
"The Heater from Van Meter" is a nickname for baseball pitcher Bob Feller, who was born and raised in Van Meter
 Van Meter, Pennsylvania, a settlement in Westmoreland County and site of the 1907 Darr Mine Disaster
Van Metre, South Dakota

Buildings named for people with this surname
Fort Van Meter (Hampshire County, West Virginia), an 18th-century frontier fort in West Virginia, USA named after Isaac Van Meter who settled there in 1744
Isaac Van Meter House, a nearby historic home built in the late 18th century.
Garrett VanMeter House, a nearby historic home built in 1830
Fort Van Meter (disambiguation), various other forts
Van Meter Hall, a dormitory in Amherst, Massachusetts named after former president of the University of Massachusetts Amherst Ralph A. Van Meter
Van Meter Hall, a Western Kentucky University campus building named after Captain Charles J. Van Meter, a local riverboat captain and developer
Van Metre Hall (Arlington Campus), an academic and office building on George Mason University’s Arlington, Virginia Campus named after the Van Metre Companies and the Van Metre family

Other things named for people with this surname
Van Meter State Park in Missouri named in 1834 after the Vanmeter family who settled there in 1834
Van Metre Ford Stone Bridge in West Virginia

See also
Jacobus van Meteren (1519–?), Dutch financier and printer of early English versions of the Bible
Emanuel van Meteren (1535–1612), historian and Consul for "the Traders of the Low Countries" in London, son of Jacobus
Harry von Meter (1871–1956), American silent film actor

References

Surnames of Dutch origin